List of Slovak composers, arranged in alphabetical order.

Slovak
List
Composers